WJJT (1540 AM) is a radio station broadcasting a Gospel music format. Licensed to Jellico, Tennessee, United States, the station is currently owned by Southeast Broadcast Corporation and features programming from Salem Radio Network.

References

External links
 

Gospel radio stations in the United States
Campbell County, Tennessee
Radio stations established in 1975
JJT